visual artist and writer

Samer Mohdad (born December 22, 1964) is a Lebanese-Belgian photojournalist. visual artist and writer.

Biography 
Mohdad was born in Bzebdine, Lebanon on December 22, 1964. His family moved to Aley following the outbreak of the Lebanese Civil War. Mohdad moved to Belgium and obtained a degree in the art of photography from École supérieure des arts Saint-Luc de Liège. Following his graduation in 1988, he joined Agence Vu in Paris. He later obtained Belgian citizenship.

In 1990, Mohdad received a World Press Photo Award for General News. He held his first solo exhibition at Musée de l'Elysée in 1990. In 1997 he established the Arab Image Foundation with Fouad Elkoury and Akram Zaatari in Beirut.

Publications
Les Enfants La Guerre, Liban 1985–1992 (1993)
Retour à Gaza (1996)
Mes Arabies (1999)
Assaoudia: XXIe s. = XVe h. (2005)
Beyrouth Mutations (2013)
Voyage en Pays: Druze (2018)

References 

1964 births
Living people
Lebanese photographers
Belgian photojournalists
20th-century photographers
21st-century photographers